Dritan Baholli (born 23 July 1974) is an Albanian football coach and a former professional footballer.

He has been assistant manager and fitness coach at Austrian Bundesliga side Rapid Vienna.

Club career
Born in Tiranë, Baholli played for Albanian giants SK Tirana and Partizani Tirana in the 1990s before moving to Austria to play for several Austrian lower league clubs.

International career
Baholli made his debut for Albania in an April 1996 friendly match against Bosnia and Hercegovina. It proved to be his only international game.

References

External links
 
 

1974 births
Living people
Footballers from Tirana
Albanian footballers
Association football defenders
KF Tirana players
FK Partizani Tirana players
SV Würmla players
Kremser SC players
First Vienna FC players
SV Wienerberger players
Kategoria Superiore players
Albanian expatriate footballers
Albanian expatriate sportspeople in Austria
Expatriate footballers in Austria
Albania international footballers